Leonel Olímpio (born 7 July 1982 in Jaguariaíva, Paraná) is a Brazilian former professional footballer who played as a defensive midfielder.

Honours
Paços de Ferreira
Taça da Liga runner-up: 2010–11

Vitória Guimarães
Taça de Portugal: 2012–13
Supertaça Cândido de Oliveira runner-up: 2011, 2013

References

External links

1982 births
Living people
Sportspeople from Paraná (state)
Brazilian footballers
Association football midfielders
Campeonato Brasileiro Série B players
União Agrícola Barbarense Futebol Clube players
Clube de Regatas Brasil players
Villa Rio Esporte Clube players
Boa Esporte Clube players
América Futebol Clube (RN) players
FK Mladá Boleslav players
Primeira Liga players
Liga Portugal 2 players
Segunda Divisão players
Gil Vicente F.C. players
F.C. Paços de Ferreira players
Vitória S.C. players
Vitória S.C. B players
Varzim S.C. players
U.D. Leiria players
Moldovan Super Liga players
FC Sheriff Tiraspol players
Brazilian expatriate footballers
Expatriate footballers in the Czech Republic
Expatriate footballers in Portugal
Expatriate footballers in Moldova
Brazilian expatriate sportspeople in the Czech Republic
Brazilian expatriate sportspeople in Portugal
Brazilian expatriate sportspeople in Moldova